is an extreme trans-Neptunian object from the extended scattered disc on a highly eccentric orbit in the outermost region of the Solar System. The detached, extended scattered disc object belongs to the group of extreme trans-Neptunian objects. It was first observed on 16 March 2013, by American astronomers Scott Sheppard and Chad Trujillo at the Cerro Tololo Observatory in Chile.

Orbit and classification 

It orbits the Sun at a distance of roughly 36–240 AU once every 1600 years. Its orbit has a high eccentricity of 0.7 and an inclination of 13° with respect to the ecliptic. It has a minimum orbital intersection distance with Neptune of 9 AU. The body's observation arc begins with its first official observation in March 2013, using the 4-meter Blanco Telescope at Cerro Tololo Observatory .

It belongs to a small group of detached objects with perihelion distances of 30 AU or more, and semi-major axes of 150 AU or more. Such extreme trans-Neptunian objects (ETNOs) can not reach such orbits without some perturbing object, which lead to the speculation of Planet Nine.
It comes to perihelion (closest approach to the Sun) around December 2119.

Numbering and naming 

As of 2018, this minor planet has neither been numbered nor named by the Minor Planet Center. The official discoverer(s) will be defined when the object is numbered.

Physical characteristics 

According to the Johnston's archive and to American astronomer Michael Brown,  measures 464 and 468 kilometers in diameter based on an assumed albedo of 0.09 and 0.07, respectively. As of 2018, no rotational lightcurve of has been obtained from photometric observations. The body's rotation period, pole and shape remain unknown.

See also

Notes

References

External links 
 List Of Centaurs and Scattered-Disk Objects, Minor Planet Center
 
 

Minor planet object articles (unnumbered)

20130316